Nodaway Township is a township in Taylor County, Iowa, USA.

History
Nodaway Township was established in 1858.

References

Townships in Taylor County, Iowa
Townships in Iowa
1858 establishments in Iowa
Populated places established in 1858